Ferdinand Hipolito Navarro (born January 4, 1977), known professionally as Vhong Navarro, is a Filipino comedian, actor, dancer, recording artist and television host. He is a regular host on ABS-CBN's noontime variety show It's Showtime. He was also part of the dance group Streetboys alongside fellow It's Showtime host Jhong Hilario.

Assault incident
On January 22, 2014, Navarro was attacked and severely beaten by a group of men inside a condominium unit in Fort Bonifacio, Taguig, according to his manager, Chito S. Roño. Roño said Navarro was invited by a female friend named Deniece Cornejo to visit her condominium unit, where he was tied up and blindfolded by several men, threatened and then beaten up. The perpetrator was identified as Cedric Lee, who was also accompanied by several other men during the time of the incident. Following this, it was stated that Navarro would temporarily not be appearing on It's Showtime and other television projects while he continues to recover.

Navarro was accused of attempted rape, which he denied. In an interview with TV host Boy Abunda on Buzz ng Bayan, Navarro said he just arrived at the model's condo unit and then suddenly there were armed men that beat him up. On January 29, 2014, one week after the incident, Cornejo filed a rape case against Navarro, but the National Bureau of Investigation said it was unlikely that there was an attempted rape on Cornejo, based on the CCTV footage.

The controversial incident had initially raised ideologically motivated concerns over rape culture and victim blaming, particularly surrounding the negative treatment of Cornejo, the supposed rape victim. Navarro earned himself sympathy from the public as himself a victim of defamation and physical violence, whereas Cornejo faced the brunt of the public's ire. The public quickly dismissed the fact that Navarro willingly cheated on his girlfriend, Tanya Winona, with the unsuspecting Cornejo. Moreover, the public responded to Navarro's mauling by sending Cornejo death threats, and even more rape threats. In an article posted on GMA News Online, Carljoe Javier expressed consternation with the treatment of the alleged rape of Cornejo:
 "I understand that there are certain aspects of this case which raise possible opportunities for discussion. The most important point for discussion would be the way that we are now discussing rape. It's disgusting how certain people have taken this as an opportunity to attempt to discredit rape victims as people who are just crying wolf. Many women are victims of sexual assault and sexual abuse and we must acknowledge this and attempt to prevent these terrible acts from happening. This is a truth regardless of the veracity of the claims of Deniece Cornejo." 

When asked to explain her situation, Cornejo reported to the Inquirer and stated, "Victim blaming is a very common practice throughout the world especially for rape victims".

On February 19, 2014, another rape case was filed against Navarro, by a woman named Roxanne Cabanero, alleging the rape took place in 2010.

On March 8, 2014, Navarro made a return to It's Showtime.

On April 10, 2014, DOJ dismissed the rape complaint filed by Deniece Cornejo against Navarro. A week later, DOJ issued a warrant of arrest against Cornejo and Lee. On April 26, Lee and his accomplice were captured and arrested in Oras, Eastern Samar. On May 5, Cornejo surrendered to Camp Crame.

On September 16, 2014, the Taguig court set a PhP 500,000 bail for Lee, Raz and Cornejo.

On January 25, 2015, businessman Ferdinand Guerrero was arrested by agents of the National Bureau of Investigation (NBI) inside the penthouse of Ritz condominium in Makati as one of the suspects.

On July 21, 2022, the Court of Appeals' 14 Division reversed the DOJ's decision to dismiss Cornejo's complaint.  

On September 19, 2022, the Taguig Court issued an arrest warrant against Navarro 8 years after the incident happened. He surrendered to the NBI on the same day.

On September 19, 2022, Navarro surrendered to the National Bureau of Investigation (NBI) after trial courts in Taguig issued him separate warrants for rape and "acts of lasciviousness" committed against Deniece Cornejo in 2014. Prosecutors said that the rape and molestations occurred at the hotel where Navarro was also falsely imprisoned and beaten by Cedric Lee and his accomplices as a result; the extent of his injuries made headlines at the time, and his assailants were eventually convicted. Navarro has maintained he did not rape Cornejo, claiming the pair did not engage in any sexual activity; and that Cornejo, Lee and his companions were seeking to extort him for financial gain.

On November 17, 2022, the NBI received orders from the Taguig city court to transfer Navarro to a Bureau of Jail Management and Penology (BJMP) facility in Camp Bagong Diwa while pending the resolution of his petition for bail.

On December 6, 2022, the court allowed Navarro to post  (roughly $18,000) bail.

On January 12, 2023, the court denied Cornejo's appeal to cancel Navarro's bail. In March 2023, the Philippine Supreme Court dismissed the charges due to lack of probable cause as well as noted what they considered to be material inconsistencies in complainant Deniece Cornejo's complaint-affidavits concerning one of the elements of the crime charged in the indictment.

Discography

Studio albums
Totoy Bibbo (2004)
Don Romantiko (2005)
Chickboy (2007)
Let's Dance (2008)

Compilation albums
Best Novelty Hits (2008)

Songs/music videos
"Hari ng Dance Floor" (It's Showtime the Album)
"Mr. Papabol" (I Star 15 album)
"Ayos Na Ang Buto-Buto"
"Cha Cha Cha"
"Chickboy" (from the movie Agent X44)
"Don Romantiko" (from the movie D' Anothers)
"Huwag Kang Makulit" (from the TV series Kulilits)
"Magandang Umaga"
"Minahal Kita" (featuring Gloc-9)
"Pata-Pata-Pon" (featuring Streetboys)
"Pamela" (from the movie Otso-Otso, Pamela-Mela Wan)
"Supah Papalicious Man" (from the movie Supah Papahlicious)
"Totoy Bibbo"
"Da Vhong Song" ('from the movie Da Possessed)

Filmography

Television

Films

Awards and recognitions

References

External links
 

1977 births
Living people
People from Makati
People from Sampaloc, Manila
Male actors from Metro Manila
Filipino male comedians
Filipino male dancers
Filipino male film actors
Filipino male television actors
Filipino television variety show hosts
Kapampangan people
Star Magic
ABS-CBN personalities
20th-century Filipino male actors
21st-century Filipino male actors
21st-century Filipino male singers